Weert may refer to:

Weert, Netherlands
Weert, Antwerp, Belgium
Weert, Belgian Limburg, Belgium